The 2021 Copa CONMEBOL Libertadores de Futsal was the 20th edition of the Copa Libertadores de Futsal, South America's premier club futsal tournament organized by CONMEBOL. The tournament was held in Florida, Uruguay between 16–22 May 2021.

The tournament was originally scheduled to be played from 1 to 8 May 2021, but was re-scheduled from 15 to 22 May at request of the Local Organizing Committee. However, the start date was delayed to 16 May due to problems with the teams' flights and permits to enter the host country.

Carlos Barbosa were the defending champions.

Teams
The competition was contested by 12 teams: the title holders, one entry from each of the ten CONMEBOL associations, plus an additional entry from the host association.

Notes

Venues
The tournament was played at the Polideportivo 10 de Julio in Florida, Uruguay.

Draw
The draw of the tournament was held on 27 April 2021, 12:00 UYT (UTC−3). The draw was conducted based on Regulations Article 16 as follows:

Initially, three teams were seeded and assigned to the head of the groups (Carlos Barbosa automatically to Group A, the others two via a draw from pot 1):

To Group A: as 2019 Copa Libertadores champions, Carlos Barbosa (Brazil)
To Group B: as champions of the host association, Peñarol (Uruguay)
To Group C: as the representative of the runner-up national association of the 2019 Copa Libertadores, Cerro Porteño (Paraguay)

The remaining nine teams were split into three pots of three based on the final placement of their national association's club in the previous edition of the championship, with the highest three (Colombia, Peru and Brazil) placed in Pot 2, the next three (Vanezuela, Argentina and Chile) placed in Pot 3 and the lowest two (Bolivia and Ecuador) in pot 4, alongside the additional Uruguayan club. From each pot, the first team drawn was placed into Group A, the second team drawn placed into Group B and the final team drawn placed into Group C. Clubs from the same association could not be drawn into the same group.

The draw resulted in the following groups:

Squads

Each team has to submit a squad of 14 players, including a minimum of two goalkeepers.

Group stage
The top two teams of each group and the two best third-placed teams advance to the quarter-finals.

Tiebreakers
The teams are ranked according to points (3 points for a win, 1 point for a draw, 0 points for a loss). If tied on points, tiebreakers are applied in the following order (Regulations Article 21):
Results in head-to-head matches between tied teams (points, goal difference, goals scored);
Goal difference in all matches;
Goals scored in all matches;
Drawing of lots.

All times are local, UYT (UTC−3).

Group A

Group B

Group C

Ranking of third-placed teams

Ranking of fourth-placed teams

Final stage
In the quarter-finals, semi-finals and final, extra time and penalty shoot-out would be used to decide the winner if necessary (no extra time would be used in the play-offs for third to twelfth place).

Bracket
The quarter-final matchups are:
QF1: Winner Group A vs. 2nd Best Third Place
QF2: Winner Group B vs. 1st Best Third Place
QF3: Winner Group C vs. Runner-up Group A
QF4: Runner-up Group B vs. Runner-up Group C

The semi-final matchups are:
SF1: Winner QF1 vs. Winner QF4
SF2: Winner QF2 vs. Winner QF3

Quarter-finals

Semi-finals

5th–8th place

1st–4th place

Finals

11th place match

9th place match

7th place match

5th place match

3rd place match

Final

Final ranking

Notes

References

External links
CONMEBOL Libertadores Futsal Uruguay 2021, CONMEBOL.com

2021
2021 in South American futsal
2021 in Uruguayan football
May 2021 sports events in South America
International futsal competitions hosted by Uruguay